Protaetia alboguttata is a species of flower chafer found in India, Nepal and Sri Lanka,

Description
They are polyphagous beetle known to destroy brinjal plantations where adults feed on the tender shoots, flowers and flower buds. Attacks are more common in the early morning. In 2000, they were found from maize tassels during rainy season with characteristic aggregation habit. Apart from them, adult aggregations are also found from ripe fruits of Ficus carica, Averrhoa carambola and Carissa carandus.

Gallery

References 

Cetoniinae
Insects of India
Beetles of Sri Lanka
Insects described in 1826
Insects of Nepal